Moisie is a district (secteur) of the city of Sept-Îles, Quebec.  Prior to February 12, 2003 it was an independent city; on that date, it and Gallix, Quebec were merged into Sept-Îles.

History

Originally Moisie was a small fisherman village that had been located at the mouth of the Moisie River. The village, which was at sea level, was relocated in 1967 after several storm surge floods.

The community became home to RCAF Station Moisie in the late 1950s, when the Royal Canadian Air Force established a Pinetree Line early warning radar station nearby.  The facility was later renamed CFS Moisie and closed by the early 1990s after defence cutbacks.

Molson Inc. established a smelter on the other bank of the river in the late 19th century. The company was plowing through three feet of pure iron black sand lying on the beaches as raw material for the forge. Prospectors later explored the region upstream of the river which led to the discovery of large iron ore deposits around Labrador City and Schefferville.

External links

Neighbourhoods in Sept-Îles, Quebec
Former municipalities in Quebec
Populated places disestablished in 2003